Whitefish Lake is a lake in the Canadian province of Manitoba. It is located on the western side of the province immediately east of the border with Saskatchewan in the Porcupine Hills of the Manitoba Escarpment. The lake is in Manitoba's Porcupine Provincial Forest, which is a boreal forest. Accessed is on the east side from Provincial Road 279.

Several small creeks from the surrounding hills, muskeg, and smaller lakes feed into Whitefish Lake. Whitefish Creek is the outflow. It is located on the western side of the lake and flows west into Saskatchewan and then into Woody River. Woody River works itself south then back east into Manitoba and eventually empties into Swan Lake. The whole system is in the Nelson River watershed, which flows into the Hudson Bay.

Parks and recreation 
Whitefish Lake Provincial Park is a provincial park on the eastern shore of Whitefish Lake. The park has 81 unserviced campsites and 29 cottages as well as lake access for fishing, swimming, and other watersports. The area also has picnic sites and hiking trails.

Fish species 
Fish commonly found in the lake include walleye, northern pike, yellow perch, lake whitefish, cisco, and burbot.

See also 
List of lakes of Manitoba
Hudson Bay drainage basin

References 

Lakes of Manitoba